James Arlington Bennet (17881863) was an attorney, newspaper publisher, educator and author.

Born in New York, Bennet was the proprietor of Arlington House, a Long Island educational institution. Bennet was appointed inspector-general of the Nauvoo Legion in April 1842, and was baptized into the Church of Jesus Christ of Latter Day Saints by Brigham Young on August 30, 1843. He was invited to be Joseph Smith's running mate in the presidential campaign of 1844, but the invitation was withdrawn due to a misunderstanding regarding Bennet's supposed birth in Ireland, which would have made him ineligible for the presidency under the Constitution's natural-born-citizen clause.

References

1788 births
1863 deaths
Nauvoo Legion
19th-century American journalists
People from New York (state)
American Latter Day Saints
Educators from New York (state)
19th-century American educators
19th-century American lawyers